Pepperfry is an Indian online marketplace for furniture and home décor. The company is headquartered in Mumbai, Maharashtra.

History 
Ex eBay executives Ambareesh Murty and Ashish started Pepperfry in Mumbai in 2012. The company opened its first offline store in Mumbai in 2014, and by 2019 there were over 70 stores across 28 cities in India.

The company has four warehouses in Bangalore, Jodhpur, Mumbai, and Delhi.

In 2020 Pepperfry ventured into home interior partnering with Hettich, Bosch, Siemens, Kajaria, Gyproc, among others.

Funding 
The company has raised a total of $240.5 million in over eight funding rounds.
	
In 2011 the company raised $5 million in its initial funding round and $8 million in a Series B funding round in 2013, both led by Norwest Venture Partners India (NVP).

In May 2015 the company secured $15 million in a Series C funding round led by Bertelsmann India Investments and NVP.

In July 2015 the company secured $100 million in a Series D funding round from early backers and Goldman Sachs and Zodius Technology Fund.

In 2016 the company raised $69 million in total in Series E funding round from State Street Global Advisors and exiting investors.

Awards and recognition 
2019: Top 10 start-ups' by Entrepreneur magazine

References

External links 
 Official website
 Official Blog

Online retailers of India
Companies based in Mumbai
Furniture companies of India
Indian brands
Retail companies established in 2011
Retail companies of India
Furniture retailers of India